DWN may refer to:

 DWN (Indian railway station), a railway station located at the northernmost point of Bhopal
 DWN (United Kingdom railway station), a railway station in Blackburn that opened in 1847